"We Got Love" is a song performed by Australian singer Jessica Mauboy. The song was released on 9 March 2018 and is co-written by Mauboy with DNA Songs' Anthony Egizii and David Musumeci. It represented Australia in the Eurovision Song Contest 2018 in Lisbon, Portugal. The single reached the top 50 on the ARIA Charts.

Eurovision Song Contest

In May 2014 Jessica Mauboy performed "Sea of Flags" as a non-competing, guest at the second semi-final of the Eurovision Song Contest 2014 in Copenhagen, Denmark. On 11 December 2017 "We Got Love", sung by Mauboy, was confirmed by Special Broadcasting Service (SBS) as Australia's representative for the 2018 contest. The song competed in the second semi-final, held on 10 May 2018 in Lisbon, Portugal, and was announced as one of the ten qualifiers for the grand final.

In the final, Mauboy performed 16th and "We Got Love" finished in 20th position with 99 points.

Track listing

Charts

Release history

References

2018 songs
Eurovision songs of 2018
Eurovision songs of Australia
Sony Music Australia singles
Jessica Mauboy songs
Songs written by Jessica Mauboy
Songs written by Anthony Egizii
Songs written by David Musumeci